Eardwulf was King of Kent, jointly with Æðelberht II.

Eardwulf is known from two charters, one is undated , but identifies Eardwulf's father as Eadberht I (a patre meo Eadberhtuo); the other has a date that is incompatible with its witness list , as it is dated 762, but witnessed by Archbishop Cuðbert, who died in 760; it was also witnessed by King Æðelberht II (Aethilberchtus rex Cantie).

External links

See also
List of monarchs of Kent

Chronology of Kentish Kings

Kentish monarchs
8th-century English monarchs